The BeiDou Navigation Satellite System (BDS) is a Chinese satellite navigation system. It consists of two separate satellite constellations. The first BeiDou system, officially called the BeiDou Satellite Navigation Experimental System and also known as BeiDou-1, consisted of three satellites which, beginning in 2000, offered limited coverage and navigation services, mainly for users in China and neighboring regions. BeiDou-1 was decommissioned at the end of 2012.
The second generation of the system, officially called the BeiDou Navigation Satellite System (BDS) and also known as COMPASS or BeiDou-2, became operational in China in December 2011 with a partial constellation of 10 satellites in orbit. Since December 2012, it has been offering services to customers in the Asia-Pacific region.

In 2015, China launched the third generation BeiDou system (BeiDou-3) for global coverage. The first BDS-3 satellite was launched on 30 March 2015. On 27 December 2018, BeiDou Navigation Satellite System started providing global services. The 35th and the final satellite of BDS-3 was launched into orbit on 23 June 2020. It was said in 2016 that BeiDou-3 will reach millimeter-level accuracy (with post-processing). On 23 June 2020, the latest BeiDou satellite was successfully launched marking the launch of the 55th satellite in the Beidou family. The third iteration of the Beidou Navigation Satellite System provides full global coverage for timing and navigation, offering an alternative to Russia's GLONASS, the European Galileo positioning system, and the US's GPS.

According to China Daily, in 2015, fifteen years after the satellite system was launched, it was generating a turnover of $31.5 billion per annum for major companies such as China Aerospace Science and Industry Corporation, AutoNavi Holdings Ltd., and China North Industries Group Corp. The industry has grown an average of over 20% in value annually to reach $64 billion in 2020  according to Xinhua citing data.

Domestic industry reports forecast the satellite navigation service market output value, directly generated and driven by the Beidou system, will be worth 1 trillion yuan ($156.22 billion) by 2025, and $467 billion by 2035.

Nomenclature 
The official English name of the system is BeiDou Navigation Satellite System. The name literally means "Northern Dipper", the name given by ancient Chinese astronomers to the seven brightest stars of the Ursa Major constellation. Historically, this set of stars was used in navigation to locate the North Star. As such, the name BeiDou also serves as a metaphor for the purpose of the satellite navigation system.

History

Conception and initial development 
The original idea of a Chinese satellite navigation system was conceived by Chen Fangyun and his colleagues in the 1980s. The Gulf War in 1991 showcased how the GPS gave the US complete advantage on the battlefield and how satellite navigation systems can be used to conduct "space warfare". In 1993, China realised the risk of denied access to GPS during the Yinhe incident and including an alleged case in 1996 during the Third Taiwan Strait Crisis, gave impetus to the creation of its own indigenous satellite navigation system which officially began in 1994.

According to the China National Space Administration, in 2010, the development of the system would be carried out in three steps:

 2000–2003: experimental BeiDou navigation system consisting of three satellites
 By 2012: regional BeiDou navigation system covering China and neighboring regions
 By 2020: global BeiDou navigation system

The first satellite, BeiDou-1A, was launched on 30 October 2000, followed by BeiDou-1B on 20 December 2000. The third satellite, BeiDou-1C (a backup satellite), was put into orbit on 25 May 2003. The successful launch of BeiDou-1C also meant the establishment of the BeiDou-1 navigation system.

On 2 November 2006, China announced that from 2008 BeiDou would offer an open service with an accuracy of 10 metres, timing of 0.2 microseconds, and speed of 0.2 metres/second.

In February 2007, the fourth and last satellite of the BeiDou-1 system, BeiDou-1D (sometimes called BeiDou-2A, serving as a backup satellite), was launched. It was reported that the satellite had suffered from a control system malfunction but was then fully restored.

In April 2007, the first satellite of BeiDou-2, namely Compass-M1 (to validate frequencies for the BeiDou-2 constellation) was successfully put into its working orbit. The second BeiDou-2 constellation satellite Compass-G2 was launched on 15 April 2009.

On 15 January 2010, the official website of the BeiDou Navigation Satellite System went online, and the system's third satellite (Compass-G1) was carried into its orbit by a Long March 3C rocket on 17 January 2010.

On 2 June 2010, the fourth satellite was launched successfully into orbit.

The fifth orbiter was launched into space from Xichang Satellite Launch Center by an LM-3I carrier rocket on 1 August 2010.

Three months later, on 1 November 2010, the sixth satellite was sent into orbit by LM-3C.

Another satellite, the Beidou-2/Compass IGSO-5 (fifth inclined geosynchronous orbit) satellite, was launched from the Xichang Satellite Launch Center by a Long March 3A on 1 December 2011 (UTC).

Chinese involvement in Galileo system 
In September 2003, China intended to join the European Galileo positioning system project and was to invest €230 million (US$296 million, £160 million) in Galileo over the next few years. At the time, it was believed that China's "BeiDou" navigation system would then only be used by its armed forces.

In October 2004, China officially joined the Galileo project by signing the Agreement on the Cooperation in the Galileo Program between the "Galileo Joint Undertaking" (GJU) and the "National Remote Sensing Centre of China" (NRSCC). Based on the Sino-European Cooperation Agreement on Galileo program, China Galileo Industries (CGI), the prime contractor of the China's involvement in Galileo programs, was founded in December 2004. By April 2006, eleven cooperation projects within the Galileo framework had been signed between China and EU.

However, the Hong Kong-based South China Morning Post reported in January 2008 that China was not satisfied with its role in the Galileo project and was to compete with Galileo in the Asian market.

Phase III 

 In November 2014, Beidou became part of the World-Wide Radionavigation System (WWRNS) at the 94th meeting of the International Maritime Organization (IMO) Maritime Safety Committee, which approved the "Navigation Safety Circular" of the BeiDou Navigation Satellite System (BDS).
 At Beijing time 21:52, 30 March 2015, the first new-generation BeiDou Navigation satellite (and the 17th overall) was successfully set to orbit by a Long March 3C rocket.
 On 20 April 2019, a BeiDou satellite was successfully launched. Launch occurred at 22:41 Beijing time, and the Long March 3B delivered the BeiDou navigation payload into an elliptical transfer orbit ranging between 220 kilometres and 35,787 kilometres, with an inclination of 28.5° to the equator, according to U.S. military tracking data.
 On 23 June 2020, the final BeiDou satellite was successfully launched, the launch of the 55th satellite in the Beidou family. The third iteration of the Beidou Navigation Satellite System provides global coverage for timing and navigation, offering an alternative to Russia's GLONASS and the European Galileo positioning system, as well as the US's GPS.

BeiDou-1

Description 

BeiDou-1 was an experimental regional navigation system, which consisted of four satellites (three working satellites and one backup satellite). The satellites themselves were based on the Chinese DFH-3 geostationary communications satellite and had a launch weight of 1000 kg each.

Unlike the American GPS, Russian GLONASS, and European Galileo systems, which use medium Earth orbit satellites, BeiDou-1 used satellites in geostationary orbit. This means that the system does not require a large constellation of satellites, but it also limits the coverage to areas on Earth where the satellites are visible. The area that can be serviced is from longitude 70° E to 140° E and from latitude 5° N to 55° N. A frequency of the system is 2491.75 MHz.

Completion 
The first satellite, BeiDou-1A, was launched on 31 October 2000. The second satellite, BeiDou-1B, was successfully launched on 21 December 2000. The last operational satellite of the constellation, BeiDou-1C, was launched on 25 May 2003.

Position calculation 
In 2007, the official Xinhua News Agency reported that the resolution of the BeiDou system was as low as 0.5 metre. With the existing user terminals it appears that the calibrated accuracy is 20 m (100 m, uncalibrated).

Terminals 
The price of the terminals was explained as being due to the cost of imported microchips.

Applications 
 Over 1000 BeiDou-1 terminals were used after the 2008 Sichuan earthquake, providing information from the disaster area.
 As of October 2009, all Chinese border guards in Yunnan were equipped with BeiDou-1 devices.

Sun Jiadong, the chief designer of the navigation system, said in 2010 that "Many organizations have been using our system for a while, and they like it very much".

Decommissioning 
BeiDou-1 was decommissioned at the end of 2012, after the BeiDou-2 system became operational.

BeiDou-2

Description 

BeiDou-2 (formerly known as COMPASS) is not an extension to the older BeiDou-1, but rather supersedes it outright. The new system is a constellation of 35 satellites, which include 5 geostationary orbit satellites for backward compatibility with BeiDou-1, and 30 non-geostationary satellites (27 in medium Earth orbit and 3 in inclined geosynchronous orbit), that offer complete coverage of the globe.

The ranging signals are based on the CDMA principle and have complex structure typical of Galileo or modernized GPS. Similar to the other global navigation satellite systems (GNSSs), there are two levels of positioning service: open (public) and restricted (military). The public service is available globally to general users. When all the currently planned GNSSs are deployed, users of multi-constellation receivers will benefit from a total over 100 satellites, which will significantly improve all aspects of positioning, especially availability of the signals in so-called urban canyons. The general designer of the COMPASS navigation system is Sun Jiadong, who is also the general designer of its predecessor, the original BeiDou navigation system. All BeiDou satellites are equipped with laser retroreflector arrays for satellite laser ranging and the verification of the orbit quality.

Accuracy 
There are two levels of service provided – a free service to civilians and licensed service to the Chinese government and military. The free civilian service has a 10-metre location-tracking accuracy, synchronizes clocks with an accuracy of 10 nanoseconds, and measures speeds to within 0.2 m/s. The restricted military service has a location accuracy of 10 centimetre, can be used for communication, and will supply information about the system status to the user. In 2019, the International GNSS Service started providing precise orbits of BeiDou satellites in experimental products.

To date, the military service has been granted only to the People's Liberation Army and to the Pakistan Armed Forces.

Frequencies 
Frequencies for COMPASS are allocated in four bands: E1, E2, E5B, and E6; they overlap with Galileo. The fact of overlapping could be convenient from the point of view of the receiver design, but on the other hand raises the issues of system interference, especially within E1 and E2 bands, which are allocated for Galileo's publicly regulated service. However, under International Telecommunication Union (ITU) policies, the first nation to start broadcasting in a specific frequency will have priority to that frequency, and any subsequent users will be required to obtain permission prior to using that frequency, and otherwise ensure that their broadcasts do not interfere with the original nation's broadcasts. As of 2009, it appeared that Chinese COMPASS satellites would start transmitting in the E1, E2, E5B, and E6 bands before Europe's Galileo satellites and thus have primary rights to these frequency ranges.

Although little was officially announced by Chinese authorities about the signals of the new system, the launch of the first COMPASS satellite permitted independent researchers not only to study general characteristics of the signals, but even to build a COMPASS receiver.

Compass-M1 
Compass-M1 is an experimental satellite launched for signal testing and validation and for the frequency filing on 14 April 2007. The role of Compass-M1 for Compass is similar to the role of the GIOVE satellites for the Galileo system. The orbit of Compass-M1 is nearly circular, has an altitude of 21,150 km and an inclination of 55.5°.

Compass-M1 transmits in 3 bands: E2, E5B, and E6. In each frequency band two coherent sub-signals have been detected with a phase shift of 90° (in quadrature). These signal components are further referred to as "I" and "Q". The "I" components have shorter codes and are likely to be intended for the open service. The "Q" components have much longer codes, are more interference resistive, and are probably intended for the restricted service.

The investigation of the transmitted signals started immediately after the launch of Compass-M1 on 14 April 2007. Soon after in June 2007, engineers at CNES reported the spectrum and structure of the signals. A month later, researchers from Stanford University reported the complete decoding of the "I" signals components. The knowledge of the codes allowed a group of engineers at Septentrio to build the COMPASS receiver and report tracking and multipath characteristics of the "I" signals on E2 and E5B.

Operation 

In December 2011, the system went into operation on a trial basis. It started providing navigation, positioning and timing data to China and the neighbouring area for free from 27 December 2011. During this trial run, Compass offered positioning accuracy to within 25 metre and the precision improved as more satellites were launched. Upon the system's official launch, it pledged to offer general users positioning information accurate to the nearest 10 m, measure speeds within 0.2 metre per second, and provide signals for clock synchronisation accurate to 0.02 microseconds.

The BeiDou-2 system began offering services for the Asia-Pacific region in December 2012. At this time, the system could provide positioning data between longitude 55° E to 180° E and from latitude 55° S to 55° N.

The new-generation BeiDou satellites support short message service.

Completion 
In December 2011, Xinhua stated that "[t]he basic structure of the BeiDou system has now been established, and engineers are now conducting comprehensive system test and evaluation. The system will provide test-run services of positioning, navigation and time for China and the neighboring areas before the end of this year, according to the authorities". The system became operational in the China region that same month. The global navigation system should be finished by 2020.

As of December 2012, 16 satellites for BeiDou-2 had been launched, with 14 in service. And as of December 2017, 150 m Chinese smartphones (20% of the market) were equipped to utilize Beidou.

BeiDou-3 

The third phase of the BeiDou system (BDS-3) includes three GEO satellites, three IGSO satellites, and twenty-four MEO satellites which introduce new signal frequencies B1C/B1I/B1A (1575.42MHz), B2a/B2b (1191.795MHz), B3I/B3Q/B3A (1268.52MHz), and Bs test frequency (2492.028MHz). Interface control documents on the new open signals were published in 2017–2018.

On 23 June 2020, the BDS-3 constellation deployment was fully completed after the last satellite was successfully launched at the Xichang Satellite Launch Center. BDS-3 satellites also include SBAS (B1C, B2a, B1A) and search and rescue transponder capabilities.

Characteristics of the "I" signals on E2 and E5B are generally similar to the civilian codes of GPS (L1-CA and L2C), but Compass signals have somewhat greater power. The notation of Compass signals used in this page follows the naming of the frequency bands and agrees with the notation used in the American literature on the subject, but the notation used by the Chinese seems to be different.

There has also been an experimental S band broadcast called "Bs" at 2492.028 MHz, following similar experiments on Beidou-1.

Constellation 

The regional BeiDou-1 system was decommissioned at the end of 2012.

The first satellite of the second-generation system, Compass-M1 was launched in 2007. It was followed by further nine satellites during 2009–2011, achieving functional regional coverage. A total of 16 satellites were launched during this phase.

In 2015, the system began its transition towards global coverage with the first launch of a new-generation of satellites, and the 17th one within the new system. On 25 July 2015, the 18th and 19th satellites were successfully launched from the Xichang Satellite Launch Center, marking the first time for China to launch two satellites at once on top of a Long March 3B/Expedition 1 carrier rocket. The Expedition-1 is an independent upper stage capable of delivering one or more spacecraft into different orbits. On 29 September 2015, the 20th satellite was launched, carrying a hydrogen maser for the first time within the system.

In 2016, the 21st, 22nd and 23rd satellites were launched from Xichang Satellite Launch Center, the last two of which entered into service on 5 August and 30 November, respectively.

See also 

Chinese coordinate systems

References

External links 
 

 
Navigation satellite constellations
Space program of the People's Republic of China
Satellites of China
Spacecraft launched by Long March rockets